Fluorescent proteins include:

 Green fluorescent protein (GFP)
 Yellow fluorescent protein (YFP)
 Red fluorescent protein (RFP)